Oksana Serhiyivna Markarova (born 28 October 1976) is a Ukrainian politician and the current Ambassador of Ukraine to the United States since February 2021. Markarova is also a former Minister of Finance in the government of Volodymyr Groysman and Oleksiy Honcharuk. She was acting Finance minister since 8 June 2018 after Oleksandr Danylyuk was dismissed on 7 June 2018 following a conflict with Groysman.

Early life and education

Oksana Markarova was born on October 28, 1976 in the city of Rivne in an Armenian-Ukrainian family.
In 1999 Markarova received a master's degree in Ecology at the Kyiv-Mohyla Academy. In 2001, she completed a master's degree in Public Finance and Trade at Indiana University.

Career
Until transferring to the civil service in 2015, Markarova worked in the private sector. During that period she worked with Natalie Jaresko at an investment fund in Kyiv.

Since March 2015 Markarova was a Deputy Minister of Finance under successive ministers Natalie Jaresko and Oleksandr Danylyuk. In April 2016, she was appointed First Deputy Minister of Finance.

At the initiative of Oksana Markarova, in 2015 the largest open data portal in the public finance sector E-data (e-data.gov.ua) was created, which now consists of modules spending.gov.ua, openbudget.gov.ua and proifi.gov.ua. In 2018, Oksana Markarova received the Open Data Leader Award for the highest personal merit in the development of open data.

In addition to her duties as First Deputy Minister of Finance, she was also appointed as the Commissioner for Investment on 8 August 2016, a position she held until her dismissal from the role on 10 January 2019. During that time, she managed the creation and operation of the UkraineInvest Investment Attraction and Support Office and initiated the creation of the Ukrainian Startup Fund.

After Oleksandr Danylyuk was dismissed on 7 June 2018 following a conflict with Prime Minister Volodymyr Groysman Markarova was appointed acting Minister of Finance on 8 June 2018. On 22 November 2018 the Ukrainian parliament appointed her as Minister of Finance.  The beginning of the Shmyhal Government on 4 March 2020 was the end of her tenure as Minister of Finance.

On 16 December 2020, Oksana Markarova received the French National Order of Merit.

After her dismissal Markarova returned to the private sector and her work on the supervisory board of the Kyiv-Mohyla Academy.

On 25 February 2021 Ukrainian President Volodymyr Zelensky appointed Markarova Ambassador of Ukraine to the United States.

Immediately after her appointment, Markarova said that her main priorities for the new position were expanding "cooperation with the Joseph Biden administration and political dialogue based on their broad bipartisan support" and "maximum assistance to the development of Ukrainian companies in the United States and attracting American companies to Ukraine".

Other activities
 European Bank for Reconstruction and Development (EBRD), Ex-Officio Member of the Board of Governors (since 2018)

Personal life 
Markarova is married to banker and businessman Danylo Volynets. The family has four children.

See also 
 Groysman Government
 Honcharuk Government

References

External links 
 
 

1976 births
Living people
Finance ministers of Ukraine
National University of Kyiv-Mohyla Academy alumni
Ukrainian women in business
Women government ministers of Ukraine
21st-century Ukrainian women politicians
21st-century Ukrainian businesspeople
21st-century Ukrainian economists
21st-century businesswomen
Female finance ministers
National Security and Defense Council of Ukraine
Independent politicians in Ukraine
Ukrainian women ambassadors
Ambassadors of Ukraine to the United States
Ukrainian women economists
Politicians from Rivne